Dayamani Barla is a tribal journalist and activist from the Indian state of Jharkhand. She became notable for her activism in opposing Arcelor Mittal's steel plant in Eastern Jharkhand that tribal activists say would displace forty  villages.

Barla has won a number of prestigious awards for journalism. She unsuccessfully ran from the Khunti Lok Sabha Constituency, Jharkhand in the 2014 Lok Sabha elections as an Aam Aadmi Party candidate.

Early life
Dayamani was born in the tribal family (also known as Adivasi in India) in Jharkhand state of eastern India. Her family belonged to the Munda tribe. Dayamani's father like other tribals in the region was cheated out of his property, because he could not read and lacked paperwork to show his rights to the land. Her father became a servant in one city, and her mother a maid in another. Barla remained in school in Jharkhand but worked as a day labourer on farms from the 5th to 7th grades. To continue her education through secondary school, she moved to Ranchi and worked as maid to pay her way through University. She, sometimes, slept at railway stations to continue her education in Journalism.

Career
Barla works in a popular Hindi newspaper Prabhat Khabar to bring attention to myriad problems facing the Munda people and other tribal communities in the Jharkhand region. She is the National President of Indian Social Action Forum INSAF. Earlier her journalistic work was supported by a small fellowship for some years by Association for India's Development (AID). Barla owns and runs a tea shop that effectively supports her journalistic desire and career. She chose the business consciously because tea shops are gathering places where social issues are discussed.

Activism
Jharkhand region is rich in natural resources and many government and private companies have appropriated land to build number of natural resources extracting factories. Although the tribal people are supposed to receive compensation, numbers of activists allege that they do not receive adequate compensation. 
Arcelor Mittal wants to invest US$8.79 billion to set up one of the world's biggest steel plants in the area. The Greenfield steel project requires  of land and a new power plant. According to Barla, that would displace forty tribal villages. Barla and her organisation Adivaasi, Moolvaasi, Astitva Raksha Manch (Forum for the protection of tribal and indigenous people's identity) – says apart from causing massive displacement, the project will destroy the forests in the area. It will also affect the water sources and ecosystems, thereby threatening the environment and the very source of sustenance for indigenous peoples, it says. Arcelor Mittal on its part says that it does not want to grab local peoples land as is willing to negotiate with all stake holders. But Barla counters that the subsistence tribal communities will not survive the alienation from their native land and they cannot be compensated for such a loss.

Awards
Barla won the Counter Media Award for Rural Journalism in 2000 and the National Foundation for India Fellowship in 2004. Counter Media Award is funded by royalties from journalist P. Sainath's book Everyone Loves a Good Drought, and is meant for rural journalists whose (often outstanding) work gets ignored or even appropriated by the larger press at the State or national level in India.
 In 2013, she was conferred the Ellen L. Lutz Indigenous Rights Award instituted by Cultural Survival, an international NGO.

References

External links

Dayamani Barla:The voice of Jharkhand

Journalists from Jharkhand
Indian women environmentalists
Indian women journalists
Munda people
Living people
Year of birth missing (living people)
Aam Aadmi Party candidates in the 2014 Indian general election
Aam Aadmi Party politicians
Women in Jharkhand politics
21st-century Indian journalists
21st-century Indian women writers
21st-century Indian writers
Indian activist journalists
Indian human rights activists
Indian environmentalists
Women writers from Jharkhand
Adivasi women writers
Activists from Jharkhand
Adivasi activists
Adivasi writers
20th-century Indian journalists
20th-century Indian women writers
People from Khunti district
21st-century Indian women politicians
21st-century Indian politicians
Adivasi women
Scheduled Tribes of India
Indian newspaper journalists
Indian environmental writers